The 15th Parliament of Sri Lanka was the meeting of the Parliament of Sri Lanka with its membership determined by the results of the 2015 parliamentary election, held on 17 August 2015. The parliament met for the first time on 1 September 2015 and was dissolved on 3 March 2020. According to the Constitution of Sri Lanka, the maximum legislative term of the parliament is 5 years from the first meeting.

Election

The 15th parliamentary election was held on 17 August 2015. The incumbent United National Party (UNP) led United National Front for Good Governance (UNFGG) won 106 seats, an increase of 46 since the 2010 election, but failed to secure a majority in Parliament. The main opposition United People's Freedom Alliance (UPFA) won 95 seats, a decline of 49. The Tamil National Alliance (TNA), the largest party representing Sri Lankan Tamils, won 16 seats, an increase of two from 2010. The remaining eight seats were won by Janatha Vimukthi Peramuna (6), Sri Lanka Muslim Congress (1) and Eelam People's Democratic Party (1).

Results

The new parliament was sworn in on 1 September 2015. Karu Jayasuriya was elected Speaker, Thilanga Sumathipala as the Deputy Speaker and Selvam Adaikalanathan as the Deputy Chairman of Committees. Lakshman Kiriella was appointed Leader of the House and Gayantha Karunathilaka was appointed Chief Government Whip.

The Speaker recognised TNA leader R. Sampanthan as Leader of the Opposition on 3 September 2015. JVP leader Anura Kumara Dissanayaka was nominated to be Chief Opposition Whip.

The Parliament became a Constitutional Assembly on 9 March 2016 in order to formulate a new constitution for Sri Lanka.

Thilanga Sumathipala resigned as Deputy Speaker on 25 May 2018. His replacement Ananda Kumarasiri was elected on 5 June 2018.

Following the withdrawal of the UPFA from the national government, Mahinda Rajapaksa and Mahinda Amaraweera were recognised as Leader of the Opposition and Chief Opposition Whip on 18 December 2018.

Government

On 20 August 2015 the central committee of the Sri Lanka Freedom Party (SLFP), the main constituent of the UPFA, agreed to form a national government with the UNP for two years. Ranil Wickremesinghe, leader of the UNP, was sworn in as Prime Minister on 21 August 2015. Immediately afterwards a memorandum of understanding to work together in Parliament was signed by acting SLFP general secretary Duminda Dissanayake and UNP general secretary Kabir Hashim. On 3 September Parliament voted by 143 votes (101 UNFGG, 40 UPFA, 1 EPDP, 1 SLMC) to 16 votes (11 UPFA, 5 JVP), with 63 absent (43 UPFA, 16 TNA, 3 UNFGG, 1 JVP), to approve the formation of a national government.

Three UNFGG cabinet ministers were sworn in on 24 August 2015. A further 39 cabinet ministers, 28 from the UNFGG and 11 from the UPFA, were sworn in on 4 September 2015. Three more cabinet ministers, one from the UNFGG and two from the UPFA, were sworn in on 9 September 2015. 19 state ministers (11 UNFGG, 8 UPFA) and 21 deputy ministers (11 UNFGG, 10 UPFA) were also sworn in on 9 September 2015. Two more deputy ministers, both from the UPFA, were sworn in on 10 September 2015. A further cabinet minister from the UPFA was sworn in on 23 October 2015. A further cabinet minister from the UNFGG was sworn in on 25 February 2016. A UPFA state minister and two deputy ministers (one UNFGG, one UPFA) were sworn in on 6 April 2016.

Constitutional crisis

The UPFA withdrew from the national government on 26 October 2018. President Maithripala Sirisena, leader of the UPFA, dismissed Prime Minister Wickremesinghe and replaced him with former President Mahinda Rajapaksa. The following day Sirisena prorogued Parliament. A constitutional crisis ensued as the UNP refused to accept changes, describing them as unconstitutional, illegal and a coup. Over the next few days Sirisena appointed a new cabinet consisting of MPs from the UPFA, EPDP and defections from the UNP. Despite the defections the UPFA could not muster the support of a majority of MPs and with the TNA, which held the balance of power in Parliament, announcing that it would support a motion of no confidence against Prime Minister Rajapaksa, Sirisena dissolved parliament on 9 November 2018 and called for fresh elections on 5 January 2019. The UNP, TNA, JVP and several others challenged the dissolution in the Supreme Court which on 13 November 2018 issued a stay on the dissolution until 7 December 2018.

Parliament re-convened on 14 November 2018 when 122 (100 UNFGG, 14 TNA, 6 JVP, 2 UPFA) out of 225 MPs supported the motion of no confidence against Prime Minister Rajapaksa. Sirisena and the UPFA refused to accept the motion of no confidence, saying that Speaker Karu Jayasuriya had not followed parliamentary procedures. On 16 November 2018 parliament passed an amended motion of no confidence against Prime Minister Rajapaksa with the support of 122 MPs.  Sirisena rejected the second the motion of no confidence as well, saying that he would not re-appoint Wickremesinghe as prime minister.

On 3 December 2018, following a quo warranto petition filed by 122 MPs, the Court of Appeal issued an interim order restraining Rajapaksa and 48 ministers from functioning. On 12 December 2018  117 MPs, including 14 from the TNA, supported a motion of confidence in Wickremesinghe. A seven-bench Supreme Court unanimously ruled on 13 December 2018 that Sirisena's dissolution of parliament on 9 November 2018 was unconstitutional and null, void ab initio and without force or effect in law. The following day a three-bench Supreme Court refused to vacate the Court of Appeal's interim order but allowed for a full appeal to be heard in mid January 2019. Rajapaksa resigned as Prime Minister on 15 December 2018. Wickremesinghe was sworn in as Prime Minister the following day, ending the crisis.

Legislation

2015

2016

2017

Composition
The following are the changes in party and alliance affiliations for the 15th parliament.

Light shading indicates majority (113 seats or more); dark shading indicates two-thirds majority (150 seats or more); no shading indicates minority government.

The 15th parliament saw a number of defections and counter-defections:
 3 September 2015 - 41 UPFA and 1 SLMC MPs support the formation of a national government.
 9 September 2015 - Three UPFA MPs (Indika Bandaranaike, Sumedha G. Jayasena and Lakshman Wasantha Perera) who had abstained from supporting the national government, are appointed deputy ministers.
 10 September 2015 - Two UPFA MPs (Anuradha Jayaratne, Dushmantha Mithrapala) who had abstained from supporting the national government, are appointed deputy ministers.
 23 October 2015 - UPFA MP Sarath Amunugama is appointed to the cabinet.
 6 April 2016 - UPFA MP Lakshman Senewiratne is appointed a state minister.
 30 June 2016 - Democratic Party MP Sarath Fonseka joins the UNP.
 17 January 2017 - UNFGG MP Athuraliye Rathana Thero announces that he will function as an independent MP.
 19 September 2017 - UPFA MP Arundika Fernando crosses over to the opposition.
 30 October 2017 - UPFA MP Duleep Wijesekera crosses over to the opposition.
 10 December 2017 - MEP MP Sriyani Wijewickrama joins the SLFP.
 11 December 2017 - NFF MP Weerakumara Dissanayake joins the SLFP.
 28 December 2017 - UPFA MP Nimal Lanza joins the opposition.
 15 February 2018 - The Ceylon Workers' Congress pledges support for the president.
 8 May 2018 - 16 SLFP MPs, who had voted in favour of the unsuccessful motion of no confidence against Prime Minister Wickremesinghe on 4 April 2018, cross over to the opposition.
 26 October 2018 - UPFA withdraws from the national government.
 26 October 2018 - Two UNFGG MPs (Wasantha Senanayake and Ananda Aluthgamage) pledge support for new UPFA government.
 28 October 2018 - UNFGG MP Vadivel Suresh pledges support for UPFA government.
 29 October 2018 - New UPFA government including UNFGG MP Wijeyadasa Rajapakshe and EPDP MP Douglas Devananda is sworn in.
 30 October 2018 - UNFGG MP Dunesh Gankanda joins the UPFA government.
 2 November 2018 - UNFGG MP S. B. Nawinne and TNA MP S. Viyalendiran join the UPFA government.
 4 November 2018 - UNFGG MP Ashoka Priyantha joins the UPFA government. Independent MP Athuraliye Rathana Thero pledges support for the UPFA government.
 6 November 2018 - UPFA MP Manusha Nanayakkara resigns from the UPFA government and joins the UNP.
 10 November 2018 - Two SLFP MPs (Wimalaweera Dissanayake and Lohan Ratwatte) join the Sri Lanka Podujana Peramuna (SLPP).
 11 November 2018 - 34 SLFP MPs and one UNP MP (Ananda Aluthgamage) join the SLPP.
 14 November 2018 - Two UPFA MPs (A. H. M. Fowzie and Piyasena Gamage) cross over to the opposition. Wasantha Senanayake and Vadivel Suresh resign from the UPFA government and rejoin the UNFGG.
 18 December 2018 - Three UPFA MPs (Indika Bandaranayake, Lakshman Senewiratne and Gamini Vijith Vijithamuni Soysa) cross over to the government.

Members

Deaths, resignations and disqualifications
The 15th parliament saw the following deaths, resignations and disqualifications:
 3 September 2015 - Sarath Chandrasiri Mayadunne (JVP-NAT) resigned. His replacement Bimal Rathnayake (JVP-NAT) was sworn in on 22 September 2015.
 15 September 2015 - Chamara Sampath Dassanayake (UPFA-BAD) resigned to become Chief Minister of Uva Province. His replacement Lakshman Senewiratne (UPFA-BAD) was sworn in on 22 September 2015.
 19 January 2016 - M. K. A. D. S. Gunawardana (UNFGG-NAT) died. His replacement Sarath Fonseka (UNFGG-NAT) was sworn in on 9 February 2016.
 19 January 2016 - M.A.Salman Javid (UNFGG-NAT) resigned. His replacement M. S. Thowfeek (UNFGG-NAT) was sworn in on 26 January 2016.
 2 November 2017 - Supreme Court rules that Geetha Kumarasinghe (UPFA-GAL) is disqualified from being an MP as she holds dual citizenship. Her replacement Piyasena Gamage was sworn in on 10 November 2107.
 18 January 2018 - M. H. M. Salman (UNFGG-NAT) resigned. His replacement A. L. M. Nazeer (UNFGG-NAT) was sworn in on 6 February 2018.
 23 May 2018 - M. H. M. Navavi (UNFGG-NAT) resigned. His replacement S. M. Mohamed Ismail (UNFGG-NAT) was sworn in on 8 June 2018.

List

Notes

References

Sources

 
 
 
 
 
 
 
 
 
 
 
 
 
 FA
 

2015 establishments in Sri Lanka
2015 Sri Lankan parliamentary election
 
Parliament of Sri Lanka
2020 disestablishments in Sri Lanka